Robert "Patrick" Söderlund is a Swedish businessman and video game executive. He was Executive Vice President in charge of Worldwide Studios at Electronic Arts (EA), overseeing all game production. He was later Chief Design Officer of EA. Söderlund was also known for his tenure as CEO of DICE, a Swedish video game development company that created the Battlefield series of games, which was acquired by EA in 2006. As of August 2016, he is reported to own approximately US$11 million of EA shares.

Söderlund announced he would be leaving EA after twelve years of service on 14 August 2018. Söderlund left EA following a disappointing release for Battlefield 5.

In November 2018, Söderlund was announced as the CEO of Embark Studios.

References

External links 

Profile at Electronic Arts website

Living people
Swedish chief executives
Electronic Arts employees
1973 births
Video game businesspeople